Taft Area Transit is the operator of mass transportation in Taft, California. Two routes operate within the city, which serves most of the urban development. There is also an additional route which runs between Taft and Maricopa. The routes operate in a loop, with no central hub.

References

External links
Taft Area Transit

Public transportation in Kern County, California
Transportation in Kern County, California
Bus transportation in California